Protodeltote albidula, the pale glyph, is an owlet moth (family Noctuidae). The species was first described by Achille Guenée in 1852.

The MONA or Hodges number for Protodeltote albidula is 9048.

References

Further reading

External links
 

Eustrotiinae
Articles created by Qbugbot
Moths described in 1852